Aylesford Priory, or "The Friars"  was founded in 1242 when members of the Carmelite order arrived in England from Mount Carmel in the Holy Land.  Richard de Grey, a crusader, sponsored them, and conveyed to the order a parcel of land located on his manor in Aylesford in Kent.

History

The Carmelites first came to Kent in the 13th century. Richard of Wendover (the Bishop of Kent) recognised the Carmelite foundation at Aylesford and the first General Chapter outside of the Holy Land was held there. The Chapter changed the lifestyle of the Carmelites from hermits to mendicant friars.

As a result of the English Reformation, the Carmelites had to leave the property in 1538. Over the next four centuries, the buildings were repurposed, including their use as an "opulent, stately home". Following a fire in 1930, restoration work was required, during the course of which, many of the original features were revealed.  In 1949, the property was offered for sale. This gave the Carmelites the opportunity to purchase their motherhouse, and use it for its original purpose, as a place of worship.

Additional restoration work commenced, as well as plans to construct the Shrine. Construction began in 1958, as people began to renew their interest in The Friars, after the distraction of the war years.  The first Prior, Fr. Malachy Lynch, was a charismatic figure who inspired people with the words: "Courage to Build Anew". In the presence of Cardinal Heenan, Archbishop Cyril Cowderoy rededicated the completed Shrine in 1965.

Art at The Friars

The Friars features a wide variety of modern-day religious artwork, including sculptures, paintings, stained glass and ceramics.

Sculpture

Philip Lindsey Clark was both the son of a sculptor and the father of a sculptor.  His commissions include work in Westminster Cathedral, other churches, and several War Memorials.  As Chair of the Religious Artist Guild, he introduced to The Friars, both Adam Kossoswski and his son Michael Clark.

Michael Clark  is known mainly for his religious sculptures. He was commissioned to create the small statues located over the doorways of the Courtyard.  He received the Otto Beit Medal for Sculpture for his statue of the Glorious Assumption.

Adam Kossowski was born in Poland in 1943, and studied in the Cracow and Warsaw. Academies of Art.  He began work at Aylesford in 1950. Kossowski's first major commission was from Fr. Malachy Lynch, who was Prior at Aylesford: the seven-panel History of the Carmelites of Aylesford in tempera.

His first large ceramic project, a Rosary Way, was an Aylesford commission. When Kossowski suggested that he may not be "the man who should do that", Fr. Malachy replied, "Adam, I am sure Our Lady has sent you here for that purpose."  When the Rosary Way was successfully completed, Kossowski received "the biggest ceramic commission that I ever had till then", The Vision of St. Simon Stock.

Kossowski's creative relationship with the Aylesford Carmelites lasted from 1950 to 1972, and he created for them approximately one hundred distinct pieces of art "in ceramic, tempera and oil painting, mosaic, wrought iron, and stained glass."

Stained Glass Windows

Moira Forsyth was one of the outstanding stained glass artists of the last century. The Flos Carmeli window was a personal gift of the artist, given to celebrate her reception into the Catholic Church in the Cloister Chapel on the Feast of Our Lady's birthday, 1957.  The "Flos Carmeli" (Flower of Carmel) is the first line of a hymn that Carmelites sing to Our Lady.

Dom Charles Norris is responsible for the windows in the Relic Chapel. The windows in the side chapel were designed by Norris. Norris used a style of stained glass called ‘dalles de verre’ in which ‘tiles’ of coloured glass are chipped into shape and laid, mosaic-fashion, in a matrix of resin.

Adam Kossawski designed the windows in the body of the chapel.

Hartley Wood Glass of Sunderland, made a number of windows: the diamond-designed windows in the Choir Chapel; the tribune of the Relic Chapel and St. Joseph's Chapel; the Spring of Faith windows in St. Anne's Chapel and the gold, brown and orange tinted windows in the old Convent Chapel.

Shrine 
Adrian Gilbert Scott, the architect of the Shrine, was a member of the family who have been described as "the family who built Gothic Britain".  His older brother was Giles Gilbert Scott and their father was George Gilbert Scott Jr.

The medieval building comprises the Prior's Hall; two walks of the Cloisters; the Cloister Chapel and the Courtyard with the Pilgrims’ Hall, which stands beside the River Medway.

Behind the Shrine is the Rosary Way, which is near the Peace Garden.

Barns
There are two restored barns by the main entrance one of which houses the Tearoom and Giftshop.  This barn dates to the seventeenth century.

Pottery 
Aylesford Pottery, located at the Priory, was founded by David Leach in 1954. Today it is a working pottery with a showroom. The Aylesford Pottery is one of the few surviving commercial potteries in the southeast of England making a range of handmade thrown and hand-built ceramics, in addition to architectural commissions.  Two master potters, Alan Parris and Billy Byles, run the pottery today.

Burials
Mazilia (or Marcelin/Mascelin) de Braci, wife of William de Cantilupe (died 1239)
Simon Stock
Adam Kossowski

References

Further reading
 The History of The Friars Aylesford by Fr Wilfrid McGreal O Carm
 Carmel in Britain, Essays on the Medieval English Carmelite Province by Richard Copsey (edited by Patrick Fitzgerald-Lombard)
 The Friars Aylesford by James H. Sephton
 Courage to Build a New by Edwina Fielding
 Image of Carmel The Art of Aylesford by the Carmelite Friars of Aylesford
 Adam Kossowski by Benedict Read

External links
The Friars- Aylesford, official website
Facebook Group
Aylesford Ceramics from St. Joseph's Chapel, a photoset on Flickr
An overview of Kossowski's work at Aylesford, Kent

Monasteries in Kent
1242 establishments in England
Christian monasteries established in the 13th century
1538 disestablishments in England
Carmelite monasteries in England
Adrian Gilbert Scott buildings
Carmelite churches in the United Kingdom
Roman Catholic churches in Kent
Roman Catholic shrines in the United Kingdom